The Star Wars Episode I Journal series is a young adult science fiction series published by Scholastic, written by different authors, and recounting the story of Star Wars Episode I from the perspective of different characters.

Anakin Skywalker

Star Wars Episode I Journal: Anakin Skywalker is a 1999 novel by Todd Strasser, taking the point of view of one of its main characters, Anakin Skywalker.

Queen Amidala

Star Wars Episode I Journal: Queen Amidala is a 1999 novel by Jude Watson, written from the point of view of Padmé Amidala.

Darth Maul

Star Wars Episode I Journal: Darth Maul is a 2000 novel by Jude Watson, written from the point of view of one of its supporting villains, Darth Maul.

External links 

 Star Wars Episode I Journal: Queen Amidala at Scholastic.

1999 novels
1999 science fiction novels
Books based on Star Wars
American young adult novels
Children's science fiction novels